Prison rock (Chinese: 囚歌; pinyin: qiú gē (Mandarin), cau4 go1 (Cantonese)) is music that came after the Northwest Wind trend in mainland China.  It was a transitional phase before Chinese rock.  These songs tell a story usually from a negative social life experience.

References

See also
 Shidaiqu
 Chinese Rock

Chinese styles of music
Rock music genres
Political music genres